The South African Professional Championship was a professional snooker tournament which was open only for South African players.

History
South Africa held a professional championship beginning in 1948. As with Australia it was originally held as a challenge match until 1984 (the only exception to this was 1979, when five players competed), when the WPBSA offered a subsidy of £1,000 per man to any country holding a national professional championship. This subsidy ended in 1988/1989 after which date most national championships were discontinued, with Perrie Mans winning the final edition of the tournament.

Winners

References

 
Snooker non-ranking competitions
Defunct snooker competitions
Snooker in South Africa